Ivan Hadzhinikolov (December 24, 1869 – July 9, 1934) was a Macedonian Bulgarian revolutionary, leader of the revolutionary movement in Macedonia and Adrianople vilayet. He was among the founders of the Bulgarian Macedonian-Adrianople Revolutionary Committees (IMARO) in October 1893 (the organization was renamed several times afterwards). He is considered a Macedonian by the historiography in North Macedonia.

Biography
He received elementary and secondary education in Kukush, Plovdiv and Svishtov. Then Hadzhinikolov graduated higher education at commerce in Linz. After that he worked as a Bulgarian teacher in Kostenets, Edessa, Kukush and Thessaloniki. From 1888 to 1892 he taught arithmetic and accounting at the Bulgarian Men's High School of Thessaloniki. In July 1892, he met with Kosta Shahov and Gotse Delchev in Sofia and discussed with them his idea of founding a revolutionary organization in Ottoman Macedonia.

The IMARO was founded in his house in 1893. According to him, one of the main reasons for creating the Organization was the aggressive Serbian propaganda in Macedonia. Hadzhinikolov opened a bookstore in Thessaloniki in 1893 after leaving the Bulgarian high school. After supposing to be arrested in 1901, he handed over the IMARO archives to Ivan Garvanov, who later became the new leader of the Organization. Subsequently he was arrested by the Ottomans and sent into exile in Bodrum Castle in Asia Minor. After amnesty in 1903 Hadzhinikolov went to Sofia and was engaged in booktrade and commerce. During the Balkan Wars (1912-1913), Ivan Hadzinikolov was a volunteer in the Macedonian-Adrianopolitan Volunteer Corps in the Bulgarian army. 

After the First World War, he became a prominent figure in the Macedonian immigration to Bulgaria. After a heavy illness with disordered nerves he commitеd suicide in 1934.

His grandson is the famous Bulgarian sculptor Alexandar Dyakov (1932 - 2018).

References

1869 births
1934 deaths
People from Kilkis
Bulgarians from Aegean Macedonia
Bulgarian educators
Bulgarian revolutionaries
Bulgarian military personnel of the Balkan Wars
Macedonian Bulgarians
Bulgarian people imprisoned abroad
Recipients of Ottoman royal pardons
Members of the Internal Macedonian Revolutionary Organization
Exiles from the Ottoman Empire
1934 suicides